The men's 100 m freestyle swimming event at the 2006 Asian Games was held on December 6, 2006, at the Hamad Aquatic Centre in Doha, Qatar.

Schedule
All times are Arabia Standard Time (UTC+03:00)

Records

Results

Heats

Final

References

Results

Swimming at the 2006 Asian Games